Carlton Cinema was a British digital film television channel, provided by Carlton Television. It launched in November 1998 on the ITV Digital platform and closed down in March 2003, five months after Carlton went off the air in the London region, being the last Carlton-branded television network to do so. Its sister channels were Carlton Select, Carlton World, Carlton Kids, and Carlton Food Network. The channel launched on cable in March 2000 as an evening only replacement for Carlton Select. The first film shown on the channel was the 1953 film Genevieve.

Closure
Carlton Cinema struggled to keep going after the ITV Digital platform ceased broadcasting on May 1, 2002. These struggles increased when the channel was removed from NTL's analogue channel line-up in September 2002. At the same time Carlton had been negotiating with BSkyB to get the channel onto Sky, but no deal was agreed. The closure was announced on December 9, 2002. The channel closed on March 31, 2003. On that night came the last three films on Carlton Cinema, Genevieve, which was the first film to be broadcast on the channel's launch night, The Inn of the Sixth Happiness, and finally, the 1981 neo-noir Body Heat. Following the conclusion of Body Heat, continuity announcer Fiona Goldman made the closing announcement:

Then they aired a montage of scenes and quotes from all the films they showed, to the tune of Alice Faye's "You'll Never Know" which was regularly being shown on the channel during the final two weeks of its transmission. The farewell montage concluded with the last words ever heard on the channel:

The final image shown was a movie theatre screen curtain (one of the many icons of movie palaces during the Golden Age of Hollywood) closing, revealing (for the final time) the Carlton Cinema logo with the date of launch (15 November 1998) on the top and the date of closure (31 March 2003) on the bottom. After a final fade to black, the channel's DOG was still seen for twenty more minutes. The channel's transmitters were finally shut down at midnight.

References

External links
Carlton Cinema at TVARK

Carlton Television
Defunct television channels in the United Kingdom
Movie channels in the United Kingdom
Television channels and stations established in 1998
Television channels and stations disestablished in 2003